Choo-Choo! is a 1932 Our Gang short comedy film directed by Robert F. McGowan. It was the 114th (26th talking episode) Our Gang short that was released. It is a remake of the 1923 Our Gang film A Pleasant Journey.

Plot
Exchanging clothes with a group of runaway orphans who escape from a train, the gang ends up on a train headed for New Orleans. Pressed into service as the kids' supervisor, Travelers Aid attendant Mr. Henderson (Dell Henderson) suffers torment, especially when he tries to prevent three-year-old Spanky from socking the nose of every adult in sight.

Things come to a head late that night when Stymie accidentally releases a monkey from its cage, and the monkey in turn releases a menagerie of circus animals from the baggage car and then lights some fireworks. When the train reaches its destination the next morning, Mr. Henderson receives a telegram saying that he has the wrong children and must bring them back on a train to California.

Cast

The Gang
 George McFarland as Spanky
 Sherwood Bailey as Spud
 Matthew Beard as Stymie
 Dorothy DeBorba as Dorothy
 Bobby Hutchins as Wheezer
 Kendall McComas as Breezy Brisbane
 Harold Wertz as Bouncy
 Pete the Pup as Himself

Additional cast
 Dell Henderson as Mr. Henderson
 Donald Haines as Leader of the runaway orphans
 Wally Albright as Runaway orphan
 Georgie Billings as runaway orphan
 Buddy McDonald as runaway orphan
 Douglas Greer as runaway orphan
 Bobby Mallon as runaway orphan
 Eddie Baker as Officer
 Harry Bernard as Pullman conductor
 Silas D. Wilcox as Pullman attendant
 Estelle Etterre as Dorothy's mother
 Otto Fries as Inebriated novelties salesman
 Lyle Tayo as Secretary
 Baldwin Cooke as Extra on train
 Oliver Hardy as inebriated novelties salesman yelling as bear licks his face (voice only)

See also
 Our Gang filmography

References

External links

1932 films
1932 comedy films
1932 short films
American black-and-white films
Films directed by Robert F. McGowan
Metro-Goldwyn-Mayer short films
Our Gang films
Short film remakes
1930s American films